Eugene E. Cho is an American evangelical pastor. In July 2020, he became the third President and CEO of the Christian advocacy group Bread for the World.

Biography 
Cho was born in Seoul, immigrated to the United States at age six, and grew up in San Francisco. Cho attended Lowell High School. After undergraduate studies at University of California, Davis, Cho completed a Master of Divinity degree at Princeton Theological Seminary.

Ordained in the Evangelical Covenant Church, Cho and his wife Minhee founded Quest Church in Seattle, Washington, serving as its senior pastor from 2001 to 2018. He also founded One Day's Wages in 2009, to alleviate extreme global poverty, where he still serves as Founder and Visionary. In March 2020, Cho was elected to become the next president of the Christian advocacy group Bread for the World and assumed his post in July 2020.

Works

Notes

References

American evangelicals
American people of Korean descent
American Protestant religious leaders
Living people
Princeton Theological Seminary alumni
University of California, Davis alumni
Year of birth missing (living people)